Vernonia Peak Observatory  or VPO is a private research facility astronomical observatory owned and operated by Northwest Astronomy Group.
It is located near Vernonia between Portland and Astoria, Oregon, US.

See also 
List of observatories

References

Astronomical observatories in Oregon
Buildings and structures in Columbia County, Oregon